Andrew Philip Welinski (born April 27, 1993) is an American professional ice hockey defenseman for the Rockford IceHogs of the American Hockey League (AHL) while under contract with the Chicago Blackhawks of the National Hockey League (NHL). He was selected by the Anaheim Ducks in the third round, 83rd overall, of the 2011 NHL Entry Draft.

Playing career
Welinski attended Duluth East High School in his native Minnesota and then spent two years with the Green Bay Gamblers of the USHL starting 2010, capturing the Anderson Cup and the Clark Cup his second season, while receiving Defenseman of the Year and All-USHL First Team recognition. He was also presented with the Dave Tyler Junior Player of the Year Award that season.

He enrolled at the University of Minnesota Duluth in 2012 and was named to the 2012–13 Western Collegiate Hockey Association All-Rookie team. Prior to his senior season (2015–16), in which he served as team captain, Welinski made the College Hockey News Preseason All-America Team and the All-National Collegiate Hockey Conference Preseason Team. Following the season, he was named to the All-NCHC Second Team (for the second straight year). He made 154 appearances for the Bulldogs throughout his college career, amassing 24 goals and 53 assists.

On April 4, 2016, he signed a two-year entry-level contract with the Anaheim Ducks of the NHL and joined the Ducks' AHL affiliate San Diego Gulls on an amateur tryout agreement. He made his debut in the American Hockey League on April 6, 2016. He made his NHL debut on December 11, 2017, against the Carolina Hurricanes.

As a free agent from the Ducks following the 2018–19 season, Welinski left to sign a one-year $750,000 contract with the Philadelphia Flyers on July 1, 2019. After attending the Flyers training camp, Welinski was waived and assigned to AHL affiliate, the Lehigh Valley Phantoms for the 2019–20 season. He registered 8 goals and 21 points from the blueline for the Phantoms, however was unable to earn a recall to the Flyers.

At the conclusion of his contract with the Flyers, Welinski returned to the Anaheim Ducks organization as a free agent, securing a one-year, $750,000 contract on October 10, 2020. In the pandemic delayed  season, Welinski remained on the Ducks roster as a depth defenseman, returning NHL action in featuring in 13 regular season games.

As a free agent, Welinski left the Ducks for a second time in securing a one-year, two-way contract with the Calgary Flames on July 29, 2021.

Following a lone season within the Flames organization, Welinski left as a free agent and was signed to a one-year, two-way contract with the New York Rangers on July 14, 2022. After attending the Rangers 2022 training camp, Welinski upon clearing waivers was re-assigned to play in the 2022–23 season with AHL affiliate, the Hartford Wolf Pack. Providing a veteran presence, Welinski posted four goals and 16 points through 40 games with the Wolf Pack.

On February 28, 2023, as part of a three-team deal, Welinski was traded by the New York Rangers (along with two Rangers' draft picks) to the Chicago Blackhawks in exchange for Patrick Kane and minor league defenseman Cooper Zech.

International play
He represented the US Select Team at the 2011 World Junior A Challenge.

Career statistics

Awards and honors

References

External links
 

1993 births
Living people
American men's ice hockey defensemen
Anaheim Ducks draft picks
Anaheim Ducks players
Green Bay Gamblers players
Hartford Wolf Pack players
Ice hockey people from Duluth, Minnesota
Lehigh Valley Phantoms players
Minnesota Duluth Bulldogs men's ice hockey players
Rockford IceHogs (AHL) players
San Diego Gulls (AHL) players
Stockton Heat players
University of Minnesota Duluth alumni